There are two taxa with the name Pogonophora:
Pogonophora, an obsolete animal phylum, now treated as part of the family Siboglinidae
Pogonophora (plant), a genus in the Euphorbiaceae